Following the trial of Charles I in January 1649, 59 commissioners (judges) signed his death warrant. They, along with  several key associates and numerous court officials, were the subject of punishment following the restoration of the monarchy in 1660 with the coronation of Charles II. Charles I's trial and execution had followed the second English Civil War in which his supporters, Royalist "Cavaliers", were opposed by the Parliamentarian "Roundheads", led by Oliver Cromwell.

With the return of Charles II, Parliament passed the Indemnity and Oblivion Act (1660), which granted amnesty to those guilty of most crimes committed during the Civil War and the Interregnum. Of those who had been involved in the trial and execution, 104 were specifically excluded from reprieve, although 24 had already died, including Cromwell, John Bradshaw (the judge who was president of the court), and Henry Ireton (a general in the Parliamentary army and Cromwell's son-in-law). They were given a posthumous execution: their remains were exhumed, and they were hanged and beheaded,  and their bodies cast into a pit below the gallows. Their heads were placed on spikes at the end of Westminster Hall. Several others were hanged, drawn and quartered, while 19 were imprisoned for life. Property was confiscated from many, and most were barred from holding public office or title again. Twenty-one of those under threat fled England, mostly settling in the Netherlands or Switzerland; three settled in New England.

In literature on the execution of Charles I, the term "regicide" (literally: "king-killing") has not only been applied to the act of killing the king in 1649 itself, but also on those individuals (the so-called "regicides", thus understood to mean "king-killers") who were deemed to be in some way responsible for that act. However, "regicide" has never been a specific crime in English law, and has never been defined in law. The Indemnity and Oblivion Act did not use the term either as a definition of the act, nor as a label for those involved. Therefore, there is no agreed definition of who is to be included in the list of regicides. Historians have identified different groups of people as being suitable for the name, and some do not include the associates who also faced trial and punishment.

The list has been cited as an early blacklist: the state papers of Charles II (1681) declare: "If any innocent soul be found in this blacklist, let him not be offended at me, but consider whether some mistaken principle or interest may not have misled him to vote."

Background

Civil war, the execution of Charles I, the Interregnum and the Restoration
The English Civil War took place between 1642 and 1651. It was a series of armed conflicts and political machinations between Parliamentarians ("Roundheads", led by Oliver Cromwell) and Royalists ("Cavaliers", led by Charles I) over, principally, political power and authority. There were three main phases to the war: The first (1642–1646) and second (1648–1649) wars pitted the supporters of Charles I against the supporters of the Long Parliament, while the third (1649–1651) saw fighting between supporters of Charles's son—Charles II—and supporters of the Rump Parliament. The war ended with the Parliamentarian victory at the Battle of Worcester on 3 September 1651.

At the end of the first war, Charles I was being held by the Scottish Presbyterian army, who handed him over to the parliamentary forces. In January 1649 a trial was arranged, comprising 135 commissioners. Some were informed beforehand of their summons and refused to participate, but most were named without their consent being sought. Forty-seven of those named did not appear either in the preliminary closed sessions or the subsequent public trial. At the end of the four-day trial, 67 commissioners stood to signify that they judged Charles I had "traitorously and maliciously levied war against the present Parliament and the people therein represented". Fifty-seven of the commissioners present signed the death warrant; two further commissioners added their names subsequently. The following day, 30 January, Charles I was beheaded outside the Banqueting House in Whitehall; Charles II went into exile. The English monarchy was replaced with, at first, the Commonwealth of England (1649–1653) and then the Protectorate (1653–1659) under Cromwell's personal rule.

Following the death of Cromwell in 1658, a power struggle ensued. General George Monck—who had fought for the king until his capture, but had joined Cromwell during the Interregnum—brought an army down from his base in Scotland and restored order; he arranged for elections to be held in early 1660. He began discussions with Charles II who made the Declaration of Breda—on Monck's advice—which offered reconciliation, forgiveness, and moderation in religious and political matters. Parliament sent an invitation to Charles to return, accepting the Restoration of the monarchy as the English political form. Charles arrived in Dover on 25 May 1660 and reached London on 29 May, his 30th birthday.

Treatment of the regicides
In 1660 Parliament passed the Indemnity and Oblivion Act which granted amnesty to many of those who had supported the Parliament during the Civil War and the Interregnum, although 104 people were specifically excluded; of these 49 named individuals and the two unknown executioners were to face a capital charge. Charles would probably have been content with a smaller number to be punished, but Parliament took a stronger line, according to Howard Nenner, writing for the Oxford Dictionary of National Biography.

Of those who were listed to receive punishment, 24 had already died, including Cromwell, John Bradshaw (the judge who was president of the court) and Henry Ireton. They were given a posthumous execution: their remains were exhumed, and they were hanged, beheaded, and their remains were cast into a pit below the gallows. Their heads were placed on spikes above Westminster Hall, the building where the High Court of Justice for the trial of Charles I had sat. In 1660 six of the commissioners and four others were found guilty of regicide and executed; one was hanged and nine were hanged, drawn, and quartered. On Monday, 15 October 1660, Pepys records in his diary that "this morning Mr. Carew was hanged and quartered at Charing Cross; but his quarters, by a great favour, are not to be hanged up." Five days later he writes, "I saw the limbs of some of our new traitors set upon Aldersgate, which was a sad sight to see; and a bloody week this and the last have been, there being ten hanged, drawn, and quartered." In 1662 three more regicides were hanged, drawn and quartered. Some others were pardoned, while a further nineteen served life imprisonment. Most had their property confiscated, and many were banned from holding office or title again in the future. Twenty-one of those under threat fled Britain, mostly settling in the Netherlands or Switzerland, although some were captured and returned to England, or murdered by royalist sympathizers. Three of the regicides, John Dixwell, Edward Whalley and William Goffe, fled to New England where they avoided capture, despite years of searching.

Nenner records that there is no agreed definition of who is included in the list of regicides. The Indemnity and Oblivion Act did not use the term either as a definition of the act, or as a label for those involved, and historians have identified different groups of people as being suitable for the name.

Shortly after the Restoration in Scotland, the Scottish Parliament passed an Act of Indemnity and Oblivion. It was similar to the English Indemnity and Oblivion Act, but there were many more exceptions under the Scottish Act than there were under the English Act. Most of the Scottish exceptions were pecuniary, and only four men were executed (all for treason but none for regicide), of whom the Marquess of Argyll was the most prominent. He was found to be guilty of collaboration with Cromwell's government and beheaded on 27 May 1661.

Regicides

Commissioners who signed the death warrant

In the order in which they signed the death warrant, the Commissioners were:

Commissioners who did not sign

The following Commissioners sat on one or more days at the trial but did not sign the death warrant:

Other regicides

Others exempted from the general pardon and found guilty of treason

Under the Scottish Act of indemnity and oblivion (9 September 1662), as with the English Act, most were pardoned and their crimes forgotten, however, a few members of the previous regime were tried and found guilty of treason (for more details see General pardon and exceptions in Scotland):

Notes

References

Further reading

 

, volume I, volume II

 
Lists of English people